The 2015 Yale Bulldogs football team represented Yale University in the 2015 NCAA Division I FCS football season. This season marked the Bulldogs's 143rd overall season and the team played its home games at Yale Bowl in New Haven, Connecticut. They were led by fourth year head coach Tony Reno. They were a member of the Ivy League. They finished the season 6–4 overall and 3–4 in Ivy League play to tie for fourth place. Yale averaged 20,614 fans per game.

Previous season and offseason

The 2014 Yale Bulldogs finished the regular season 8–2, 5–2 Ivy, with their two losses to Dartmouth and Harvard. The Bulldogs came one win shy of winning a share of the Ivy League Championship. The team had the #1 Total Offense in the FCS (571.5 YPG) and the #1 3rd Down Conversion Percentage (0.517 Pct) at the end of the 2014 season.

Departures
Notable departures from the 2014 squad included seniors, Tyler Varga, who declared his eligibility for the 2015 NFL Draft, and Deon Randall.

Spring game

Yale held their annual  Blue-White Spring Game on April 18, 2015.

Awards
Offensive Big Award: Beau Iverson, OT, So
Defensive Big Award: Marty Moesta, DE, So.
Offensive Big Skill Award: Stephen Buric, TE, Jr.
Defensive Big Skill Award: Austin Carter, LB, Jr.
Offensive Skill Award: Chris Williams-Lopez, WR, Fr.
Defensive Skill Award: Dale Harris, CB, So.
Offensive Strength & Conditioning MVP: Candler Rich, RB, So.
Defensive Strength & Conditioning MVP: Victor Egu, LB, So.
Offensive Strength & Conditioning MIP: Logan Scott, QB, Jr.
Defensive Strength & Conditioning MIP: Will Bryan, DB, Fr.
One Team Award: Roger Kilgore III, Safety, Jr. & Robert Clemons III, WR, So.
Every Play Every Day Award: Austin Reuland, RB, Jr.

Personnel

Coaching staff

Schedule

Game summaries

@ Colgate Raiders

vs. Cornell Big Red

@ Lehigh Mountain Hawks

@ Dartmouth Big Green

@ Maine Black Bears

@ Penn Quakers

vs. Columbia Lions

vs. Brown Bears

@ Princeton Tigers

vs. Harvard Crimson

Awards

Preseason All-Ivy Team
First-Team Offense
OL, Luke Longinotti

First-Team Defense
DB, Foyesade Oluokun

Second-Team Offense
QB, Morgan Roberts
WR, Bo Hines
OL, Khalid Cannon

Second-Team Defense
DL, Copache Tyler
DB, Cole Champion

Third-Team Offense
RB, Candler Rich
WR, Robert Clemons
TE, Leo Haenni
OL, Mason Friedline
KR, Jamal Locke

Third-Team Defense
DL, Earl Chism
DB, Dale Harris

References

Yale
Yale Bulldogs football seasons
Yale Bulldogs football